The Battle of Ölper was a battle at Ölper, now a district of Brunswick, on 13 October 1761. It occurred between a Franco-Saxon force and a Brunswick-Hanoverian force, lasted long into the night and ended in a Brunswickian victory. It was part of the Seven Years' War.

External links

1761 - French campaign in West Germany – French and Allied last operations at kronoskaf.com

Conflicts in 1761
Battles involving France
Battles of the Seven Years' War
History of Brunswick
Principality of Brunswick-Wolfenbüttel
1761 in the Holy Roman Empire
Battles in Lower Saxony